Innocent Edward Kalogeris (born 3 March 1959) is a Tanzanian CCM politician and Member of Parliament for Morogoro South constituency since 2010.

References

1959 births
Living people
Chama Cha Mapinduzi MPs
Tanzanian MPs 2010–2015
Forest Hill Secondary School alumni